The Louisiana State University Press (LSU Press) is a university press at Louisiana State University. Founded in 1935, it publishes works of scholarship as well as general interest books. LSU Press is a member of the Association of University Presses.

LSU Press publishes approximately 70 new books each year and has a backlist of over 2000 titles. Primary fields of publication include southern history, southern literary studies, Louisiana and the Gulf South, the American Civil War and military history, roots music, southern culture, environmental studies, European history, foodways, poetry, fiction, media studies, and landscape architecture. In 2010, LSU Press merged with The Southern Review, LSU's literary magazine, and the company now oversees the operations of this publication.

Domestic distribution for the press is currently provided by the University of North Carolina Press's Longleaf Services.

Notable publications and awards
A Confederacy of Dunces by John Kennedy Toole was published in 1980 and won the 1981 Pulitzer Prize for Fiction.

Three titles have won the Pulitzer Prize for Poetry: The Flying Change by Henry S. Taylor (1986), Alive Together: New and Selected Poems by Lisel Mueller (1997), and Late Wife by Claudia Emerson (2006).

Lisel Mueller's 1981 The Need to Hold Still won the National Book Award for Poetry that year.

Wayne A. Wiegand and Shirley A. Wiegand's 2018 The Desegregation of Public Libraries in the Jim Crow South:  Civil Rights and Local Activism won the Eliza Atkins Gleason Book Award from the American Library Association Library History Round Table.

See also

 List of English-language book publishing companies
 List of university presses

References

External links
 

Press
Publishing companies established in 1935
University presses of the United States
1935 establishments in Louisiana